The Qualico Mixed Doubles Classic (QMDC) is an annual mixed doubles curling event held in Banff and Canmore Alberta, Canada. The bonspiel is held in a round-robin format with a $30,000 purse. The event attracts top curlers from around the world.

History
The event was founded in 2019 by the Rocky Mountain Curling Association and Qualico has held the naming rights since the inaugural event.

Broadcasting
The Qualico Mixed Doubles Classic has no deals with any networks; however, livestream coverage of the event is provided by the in house media team. The World Curling Tour held the worldwide streaming rights to the 2020 round-robin stage and the international streaming rights to the 2020 finals. CBC Television picked up the Canadian streaming rights to the 2020 finals for their online platform.

Past champions

References

External links
 Official Website

Mixed doubles curling 
Curling in Alberta
Banff, Alberta
Canmore, Alberta
Curling competitions in Canada